Emma Wilhelmina Koivisto (born 25 September 1994) is a Finnish professional footballer who plays as a midfielder for Liverpool in the Women's Super League. She previously played for HJK and FC Honka of the Naisten Liiga, as well as Kopparbergs/Göteborg FC, with whom she won the 2020 Damallsvenskan.

She signed for Liverpool in July 2022 after spending 18 months with Brighton & Hove Albion, taking the number 2 shirt.

She is a Finland women's national football team international, and was included in their squad for UEFA Women's Euro 2022.

College career
Koivisto attended Florida State University, playing for Florida State Seminoles; she played an average of 20 games per season and scoring 2 goals in her time at college.

International goals

Honours
Kopparbergs/Göteborg FC
Damallsvenskan: 2020

References

External links

 FSU profile
 Suomen Palloliitto profile 

1994 births
Living people
Finnish women's footballers
Finland women's international footballers
Kansallinen Liiga players
Helsingin Jalkapalloklubi (women) players
FC Honka (women) players
Expatriate women's soccer players in the United States
Florida State Seminoles women's soccer players
Finnish expatriate footballers
Women's association football defenders
Women's association football midfielders
BK Häcken FF players
Liverpool F.C. Women players
Damallsvenskan players
Expatriate women's footballers in England
Finnish expatriate sportspeople in the United States
Finnish expatriate sportspeople in England
Footballers from Helsinki
UEFA Women's Euro 2022 players
21st-century Finnish women